Route 186 is a  numbered route in the U.S. states of Connecticut and Massachusetts, serving the southeastern suburbs of Springfield, Massachusetts. The route runs from Route 190 in the Somersville section of the Connecticut town of Somers to the town center of East Longmeadow, Massachusetts. Within Massachusetts, the road is town-maintained.

Route description
The road continues across the Connecticut-Massachusetts state line as Prospect Street for another  towards East Longmeadow center. Route 186 ends at a complex seven-way intersection (the East Longmeadow Rotary) involving Route 83 (North Main Street and Somers Road), Route 220 (Shaker Road), Maple Street, Elm Street, and Pleasant Street. In Connecticut, Route 186 is known as Hall Hill Road, named after the 320-foot Hall Hil, which the road climbs over. Route 186 is classified as an urban collector road and carries average daily volumes of 2,000 vehicles.

History
Route 186 was established as a new route in the 1932 state highway renumbering in Connecticut. The continuation in Massachusetts, which was previously unnumbered, was designated in 1939. In 1951, the southern end of Route 186 was relocated to use Four Bridges Road to end at Route 83. As part of the 1962 Route Reclassification Act, the southern alignment was returned to its original location.

Major intersections

References

186
Transportation in Tolland County, Connecticut
186
Transportation in Hampden County, Massachusetts